Condons and Clangibbon is a barony in County Cork, Republic of Ireland.

Etymology

Condons and Clangibbon takes its name two ruling Norman-Irish families: Condons or Cauntons (Condún), and the FitzGibbons or White Knight.

Geography

Condons and Clangibbon is located in the northeast of County Cork.

History

The Condon territory was originally held by the O'Kiefs, before being conquered by the Norman Condons. Clangibbon was known as Ive-le-bane (Uibh Le Bán), "the white territory." Later much of the barony was owned by the Earls of Kingston.

List of settlements

Below is a list of settlements in Condons and Clangibbon:
Clondulane
Fermoy
Kildorrery
Kilworth
Mitchelstown

See also
List of townlands of the barony of Condons & Clangibbon

References

Baronies of County Cork